Seitse ('Seven') was a private Estonian television channel. It includes culture and music for Estonians and Russians of ages 25–45. Music channel Seitse showed at least 400 music videos per day.

History
The channel closed its activities on 31 December 2016 and was replaced by the new music channel MyHits TV.

Shows

Music shows
2000+
2005+
2010+
Party@KlubiTeater
Parim Eesti Muusika
Hommik Publikuga
Head isu!
80 & 90
Playlist
Seitse Rockib!
Tantsuparadiis
ÖÖ7

Other shows
Delfi Publik news
Lastekas

References

External links

Facebook page

Music television channels
Defunct television channels in Estonia
Television channels and stations established in 2007
Television channels and stations disestablished in 2016
2007 establishments in Estonia
2016 disestablishments in Estonia
Mass media in Tallinn
Music organizations based in Estonia